Adama Niane (born 16 June 1993) is a Malian professional footballer who plays as a forward for Nassaji.

Club career

Early career
Born in Bamako, Niane started his career at Yeelen Olympique, joining the club as a youth player in 2003.

Nantes
Niane joined French club Nantes in 2011. He played for the club's U19 team in the 2011–12 season, during which they finished as runners-up in the Championnat National U19 and he finished as the competition's top scorer. On 1 July 2012, Niane joined the club's reserve team. He made his first team debut for Nantes on 15 December 2012 in a Ligue 2 home match against Caen, coming on as a substitute for Jordan Veretout in the 92nd minute; Nantes won the match 2–1.

Niane played a total of 91 matches (he started in 81 of them) and scored 40 goals in the Championnnat de France Amateur and the Championnnat de France Amateur 2 for the reserved team of Nantes from 2012 to 2016. He only played 6 competitive matches and did not score any goals (3 Ligue 1, 1 Ligue 2 and 2 Coupe de France matches) for its first team during that period.

Troyes
Niane joined Ligue 2 club Troyes on 22 August 2016 on a free transfer, signing a two-year contract that would expire in June 2018. In January 2017, he extended his contract until June 2019. Niane was the top scorer in the 2016–17 Ligue 2, scoring 23 goals in 33 Ligue 2 matches.

On 11 August 2017, Niane scored the first Ligue 1 goal of his career in an away match against Nice with a lob over Yoan Cardinale in the 54th minute; in the 85th minute, he assisted Saîf-Eddine Khaoui to ensure that Troyes won the match 2–1.

Charleroi
On 29 August 2018, Niane joined Belgian First Division A side Charleroi. He made his competitive debut for the club on 1 September 2018 in a 3–1 victory in the league over Mouscron. It was in this same match that Niane scored his first goal for Charleroi, which came in the 38th minute and was assisted by Jérémy Perbet.

Niane was only used in four league games for Charleroi in the 2019-20 season and was therefore loaned out to fellow league club KV Oostende on 28 January 2020 for the rest of the season. He returned to Charleroi in the summer 2020 after five games for Oostende.

Sochaux
On 24 September 2020, Niane moved to French Ligue 2 club Sochaux, signing a deal until June 2022.

On 12 January 2022, Niane joined Dunkerque on a six-month loan.

International career
Niane was named in Mali's squad for the 2013 African Youth Championship. He scored the only goal in Mali's opening game versus Nigeria.

Niane also played at the 2013 FIFA U-20 World Cup in the Turkey.

Niane made his debut for the senior Mali national football team in a 2–1 2019 Africa Cup of Nations qualification win over Gabon on 10 June 2017.

Career statistics

International

Notes

References

External links
 

Sportspeople from Gard
Living people
1993 births
Sportspeople from Bamako
Association football forwards
Malian footballers
Mali international footballers
Mali under-20 international footballers
2013 African U-20 Championship players
2015 Africa U-23 Cup of Nations players
2019 Africa Cup of Nations players
CO de Bamako players
FC Nantes players
ES Troyes AC players
R. Charleroi S.C. players
K.V. Oostende players
FC Sochaux-Montbéliard players
USL Dunkerque players
Nassaji Mazandaran players
Ligue 1 players
Ligue 2 players
Championnat National 2 players
Championnat National 3 players
Belgian Pro League players
Malian expatriate footballers
Expatriate footballers in France
Malian expatriate sportspeople in France
Expatriate footballers in Belgium
Malian expatriate sportspeople in Belgium
Expatriate footballers in Iran
Malian expatriate sportspeople in Iran
21st-century Malian people